Eurata is a genus of moths in the subfamily Arctiinae. The genus was erected by Gottlieb August Wilhelm Herrich-Schäffer in 1853.

Species

 Eurata baeri Rothschild, 1911
 Eurata bifasciata Gaede, 1926
 Eurata elegans Druce, 1906
 Eurata helena Herrich-Schäffer, 1854
 Eurata hermione Berg, 1878
 Eurata hilaris Zerny, 1937
 Eurata histrio Guérin-Meneville, 1843
 Eurata igniventris Berg, 1878
 Eurata jorgenseni Orfila, 1931
 Eurata julia Orfila, 1931
 Eurata maritana Schaus, 1896
 Eurata minerva Schaus, 1901
 Eurata paraguayensis Schrottky, 1910
 Eurata parishi Rothschild, 1911
 Eurata patagiata Burmeister, 1878
 Eurata picta Herrich-Schäffer, 1853
 Eurata plutonica Hampson, 1914
 Eurata schausi Hampson, 1898
 Eurata selva Herrich-Schäffer, 1854
 Eurata semiluna Walker, 1854
 Eurata sericaria Perty, 1834
 Eurata spegazzinii Jörgensen, 1913
 Eurata stictibasis Hampson, 1898
 Eurata strigiventris Guérin-Meneville, 1830
 Eurata tisamena Dognin, 1902
 Eurata vulcanus Walker, 1854

References

Arctiinae